Turuptiana is a genus of moths in the family Erebidae.

Species
 Turuptiana affinis Rothschild, 1909
 Turuptiana lacipea Druce, 1890
 Turuptiana obliqua Walker, 1869

References

Natural History Museum Lepidoptera generic names catalog

Phaegopterina
Moth genera